James Joseph Sweeney (June 19, 1898 – June 19, 1968) was an American prelate of the Catholic Church. He was the first Bishop of Honolulu, serving from 1941 until his death in 1968.

Biography
Sweeney was born in San Francisco, California, to John Joseph and Catherine (née McCarrick) Sweeney. He received his early education at St. James Boys School from 1907 to 1913. He later attended Saint Patrick Seminary in Menlo Park.

He was ordained a priest for the Archdiocese of San Francisco on June 24, 1925 by Archbishop Edward Hanna at the Cathedral of Saint Mary of the Assumption in San Francisco. He served as assistant pastor until 1931 when he was appointed the archdiocesan director of the Society for the Propagation of the Faith. On November 22, 1929, Pope Pius XI conferred the title of "Right Reverend Monsignor" on Father Sweeney.

On May 20, 1941, he was appointed the first bishop of the newly erected Roman Catholic Diocese of Honolulu. He was consecrated on July 25 of that year. Bishop Sweeney saw the Honolulu see through World War II, and statehood.

He died on his 70th birthday in 1968 in San Francisco. His funeral liturgy was held at his home parish of Saint Paul in San Francisco. At his request, he was buried with his parents in a family crypt in Holy Cross Cemetery in Colma, California.

References

1898 births
1968 deaths
Catholics from California
Roman Catholic bishops of Honolulu
Participants in the Second Vatican Council
People from San Francisco
20th-century Roman Catholic bishops in the United States